Ralph Stalder (born April 3, 1986) is a retired Swiss professional ice hockey defenceman. He last played with HC Fribourg-Gottéron of the Swiss National League (NL).

Playing career
Stalder made his National League A debut playing with EHC Basel during the 2005–06 NLA season.

After seven seasons with Lausanne HC, Stalder left the club as a free agent following the 2015–16 season, he agreed to an initial three-year contract continuing in the NLA with HC Fribourg-Gottéron on 26 October 2015. He stayed until season 2019/20, then he retired.

References

External links

1986 births
Living people
EHC Basel players
EHC Biel players
HC Fribourg-Gottéron players
Genève-Servette HC players
Lausanne HC players
SC Langenthal players
EHC Olten players
Swiss ice hockey defencemen